Joginder Pal Pandey was a leader of Indian National Congress from Punjab, India. He was a member of Punjab Legislative Assembly and a minister. He was killed by militants in 1987.

After his death, his son Rakesh Pandey was elected as the MLA from Punjab.

References

Year of birth missing
1987 deaths
Victims of Sikh terrorism
Members of the Punjab Legislative Assembly
Politicians from Ludhiana
People murdered in Punjab, India
Victims of the insurgency in Punjab
Assassinated Indian politicians
Indian National Congress politicians from Punjab, India